Hudson Card (born July 29, 2001) is an American football quarterback for the Purdue Boilermakers. From 2020 to 2022, he played for the Texas Longhorns.

Early years
Card attended Lake Travis High School in Austin, Texas. As a senior, he was selected to the 2020 Under Armour All-American Game. He committed to the University of Texas at Austin to play college football.

College career

Texas 
In 2020, as a true freshman, Card played in two games as a backup to Sam Ehlinger, and ended up taking a redshirt. In 2021, as a redshirt freshman, he competed with Casey Thompson for the starting job. He won the competition and was named the starter for the opening game. In Card's first start, he went 14-for-21 on pass attempts, threw for 224 yards, 2 touchdowns, and no interceptions in the 38-18 win over Louisiana-Lafayette. However, Card lost the starting job after a poor performance in a 40-21 blowout loss versus Arkansas. On November 29, 2022, Card announced he was entering the transfer portal.

Purdue 
Card announced via Twitter he committed to Purdue on December 26, 2022.

Statistics

References

External links
Texas Longhorns bio

Living people
Players of American football from Austin, Texas
American football quarterbacks
Texas Longhorns football players
2001 births